The 2011 World Interuniversity Games were the 13th edition of the Games (organised by IFIUS, and were held in Amsterdam, the Netherlands, from October 10 to October 14, 2011.

Competitions
Football Men: 
1. University of Applied Sciences Wiener Neustadt (Wiener Neustadt, Austria) 
2. Moscow State ESI University (Moscow, Russia) 
3. ASE Bucharest (Bucharest, Romania) and University of Vienna (Vienna, Austria)

Football Women : University Abderrahmane Mira de Bejaia (Algeria) (Béjaïa, Algeria) 
Futsal Men : Islamic Azad University, Karaj Branch (Karaj, Iran) 
Basketball Men : Islamic Azad University, Karaj Branch (Karaj, Iran) 
Basketball Women : Università Cattolica del Sacro Cuore (Milan, Rome, Italy) 
Volleyball Men : Antwerp University Association (Antwerp, Belgium) 
Volleyball Women : University of Bacău (Bacău, Romania) 
Golf and Pitch & Putt : Mendeleyev University of Chemical Technology (Moscow, Russia) 
Individual golf : Volkov Roman, Mendeleyev University of Chemical Technology (Moscow, Russia) 
Individual pitch & putt: Grajdianu Ilia, Mendeleyev University of Chemical Technology (Moscow, Russia)

References

2011 in multi-sport events
2011 in Dutch sport
2011
International sports competitions hosted by the Netherlands
Multi-sport events in the Netherlands
World Interuniversity Games, 2011
October 2011 sports events in Europe
2010s in Amsterdam